Polpenwith (meaning creek of the red headland) is a hamlet south of Constantine in west Cornwall, England. It is at the head of a creek which leads to the Helford River.

References

Hamlets in Cornwall